Queensland floods or Brisbane floods may refer to:

 1893 Brisbane flood
 1974 Brisbane flood
 March 2010 Queensland floods
 2010–2011 Queensland floods
 January 2012 floods
 January 2013 eastern Australia floods; see Cyclone Oswald
 2021 eastern Australia floods
 2022 eastern Australia floods

See also
 Brisbane River#Floods